Christian Lattanzio (born 10 September 1971), is an Italian football coach who is currently the head coach for Charlotte FC of Major League Soccer.

Career

Christian Lattanzio was born on 10 September 1971.

On 31 May 2022, Lattanzio became the interim coach for Charlotte FC, after Spanish coach, Miguel Ángel Ramírez, had been fired.

He had been an assistant coach for the Manchester City youth team, New York City FC under French coach Patrick Vieira, and OGC Nice, and had worked with fellow Italian coaches, Fabio Capello, Gianfranco Zola, and Roberto Mancini.

On October 26, 2022, Charlotte FC announced that Lattanzio had signed a contract extension to become the club's permanent head coach through 2024, with an option for the 2025 season. Lattanzio coached the team to an 8-10-2 record following Ramírez's firing, and kept the first-year expansion team in playoff contention until the final week.

Managerial statistics

References

1971 births
Living people
Italian football managers
Charlotte FC non-playing staff